Inter-alpha-trypsin inhibitor heavy chain H1 is a protein that in humans is encoded by the ITIH1 gene.

See also 
 Inter-alpha-trypsin inhibitor
 ITIH2
 ITIH3
 ITIH4

References

Further reading